Forstrarchaea is a monotypic genus of Polynesian shield spiders containing the single species, Forstrarchaea rubra. It was first described by Michael Gordon Rix in 2006, and is only found on the Polynesian Islands.

See also
 List of Malkaridae species

References

Malkaridae
Monotypic Araneomorphae genera
Spiders of New Zealand